Clint is a town in El Paso County, Texas, United States. The population was 926 at the 2010 census. It is part of the El Paso Metropolitan Statistical Area.

Geography

Clint is located at  (31.590844, –106.229129).

Demographics

2020 census

As of the 2020 United States census, there were 923 people, 244 households, and 168 families residing in the town.

2000 census
As of the census of 2000, there were 980 people, 308 households, and 255 families residing in the town. The population density was 502.4 people per square mile (194.0/km2). There were 337 housing units at an average density of 172.8 per square mile (66.7/km2). The racial makeup of the town was 75.41% White, 0.20% African American, 0.41% Native American, 0.41% Asian, 0.10% Pacific Islander, 20.71% from other races, and 2.76% from two or more races. Hispanic or Latino of any race were 83.98% of the population.

There were 308 households, out of which 35.4% had children under the age of 18 living with them, 64.6% were married couples living together, 14.3% had a female householder with no husband present, and 16.9% were non-families. 15.3% of all households were made up of individuals, and 7.1% had someone living alone who was 65 years of age or older. The average household size was 3.18 and the average family size was 3.58.

In the town, the population was spread out, with 26.5% under the age of 18, 10.5% from 18 to 24, 23.3% from 25 to 44, 26.5% from 45 to 64, and 13.2% who were 65 years of age or older. The median age was 38 years. For every 100 females, there were 100.0 males. For every 100 females age 18 and over, there were 93.0 males.

The median income for a household in the town was $34,000, and the median income for a family was $36,635. Males had a median income of $29,205 versus $20,313 for females. The per capita income for the town was $14,784. About 16.6% of families and 20.0% of the population were below the poverty line, including 25.6% of those under age 18 and 16.8% of those age 65 or over.

Education
The Town of Clint is served by the Clint Independent School District. It is zoned to Clint High School, Clint Junior High School, and Surratt Elementary School, all located in Clint. Clint Early College High School, which serves the Clint Independent School District, is also located in Clint.

Children Detention Camp 

In 2019, approximately 250 unaccompanied migrant children were held at a Customs and Border Patrol facility near Clint. According to authorities, children received "hygiene products and food — including new clothing, hand sanitizer, soap and water;" showers were available at least "every three days," depending on the level of crowding. However, other visitors to the facility, including visitors affiliated with Human Rights Watch, reported "unsanitary, crowded living conditions," in which children lacked toothbrushes, showers, and soap, and suffered from flu and lice. One pediatric emergency physician described the treatment of children in the facility as reportable child neglect.

According to the Pacific Standard, "Sarah Fabian, the senior attorney in the Department of Justice's Office of Immigration Litigation, argued that the sorts of conditions children were experiencing in Customs and Border Protection custody in Clint were perfectly legal," as "safe and sanitary" in Reno v. Flores is a vague requirement which doesn't specify toothbrushes, soap, etc.

Educational programs for children in this type of facility were canceled by the Department of Health and Human Services in June 2019.

History
According to Martin Donell Kohout of The Handbook of Texas Online:

Pop culture references
In the Robert A. Heinlein story The Year of the Jackpot, published in 1952, Clint is the home of a messianic cult that arises after the collapse of America. By radio donors are told to mark their contributions "Messiah" and send them there via Kingdom Messenger or pilgrim.

Clint was mentioned in the 1957 autobiographical novel On the Road by American novelist Jack Kerouac as the mailing address of XELO, a radio station based in Ciudad Juárez.

Clint, Texas, was also mentioned in Johnny Cash's 1966 song "Red River Valley" from the album Everybody Loves a Nut, in which Cash repeatedly states that he bought his first harmonica for $2.98 in Clint.

Notable people 

 Jan Herring (1923–2000), artist

References

External links
 Town of Clint

Towns in El Paso County, Texas
Towns in Texas